B.P. Mahesh Chandra Guru (born 31 January 1957) is an Indian academician and retired Professor of Journalism and Mass Communication at University of Mysore, India. Known for making controversial statements, Guru has publicly defended and supported Beef fests, and has been called 'anti-Ram' and 'Ram-critic' for his statements against Hindu god, Rama. As an activist, Guru has openly criticized Brahmanical hegemony.

Education and career 
Guru did BA and MA in Journalism and Mass Communication from the University of Mysore in 1978 and 1980, respectively. He earned doctorate degree (PhD) in the same from University of Mangalore in 1999. Guru was previously a research associate at National Institute of Rural Development, and has worked as a lecturer at University of Bangalore and as a reader at University of Mangalore.

Controversies 
In January 2015, Karnadu Sarvodaya Sena, a Hindutva Organization, lodged a complained against Guru for making derogatory and insulting remarks against Lord Ram. On 17 June 2016, in the same case, a Mysore court remanded Prof. Guru in judicial custody but was released from the jail after getting bail on 21 June. Guru was temporarily suspended by the University of Mysore for the same remarks in 2016.

In 2015, Prof. Guru, along with other three professors, had participated in the a programme where Bhagwad Gita, a Hindu scripture which is part of Epic Mahabharata, was burnt. In the aftermath of the same, the Vishwa Hindu Parishad (VHP) registered a case of "hurting religious sentiments" against the Prof. Guru, Prof Arvindamgatti, Prof. Bhagwan, and Prof Bangere Mahesh.

In 2022, Guru called out the Karnataka's state government for wasting money by funding and granting land to Karnataka Samskrit University.

Mahishasura Dasara 
In 2015, Guru called Mahishasura, a mythological demon killed by Hindu Goddess Mahishasurmardini or Chandmundeshwari, a 'buddhist' king and a symbol of human values, equality and justice. He asserted that Mahishasura is being falsely projected as a demon with made up fictitious stories backing it, and his real name was Mahisha who was ruled Mahisha Mandala.

In 2018, Guru conducted prayers near the Mahishasura statue atop Chamundi Hills, Karnataka. These celebrations are called 'Mahisha Habba' or 'Mahisha Dasara' by the followers. In 2020, after resistance in conducting Mahisha Habba, Guru warned the government not to hault the celebrations.

References 

1957 births
Mass media scholars
Living people
People from Mysore